This is a list of states in the Holy Roman Empire beginning with the letter A:

References

A